{{DISPLAYTITLE:C12H14N2O3}}
The molecular formula C12H14N2O3 (molar mass: 234.25 g/mol, exact mass: 234.1004 u) may refer to:

 Cyclopentobarbital
 Diproqualone